5-7-9 is a low to mid-end fashion retailer, commonly found in malls throughout the continental United States and Puerto Rico, and formerly Hawaii. It is a sister company to Rainbow Shops. The chain offers mid to low-priced fashions for young teens and young women between 13 and 22 years of age. The store's name refers to the junior miss clothing sizes the store specializes in.

History
In , Edison Brothers Stores purchased the 5-7-9 chain, making it one of numerous clothing and shoe chains the company expanded nationwide. In , Edison Brothers, which had gone bankrupt and was being liquidated, sold the 5-7-9 stores to a newly formed subsidiary of A.I.J.J. Enterprises, Inc., owner of Rainbow Shops. 

Rainbow is headquartered in Brooklyn, New York

References

Clothing retailers of the United States
Companies that filed for Chapter 11 bankruptcy in 1995
Companies that filed for Chapter 11 bankruptcy in 1999